Ats Bonninga (fl. 1494), was a Dutch noble, known for her defence of the fortress in Warns in Gaasterland during the conflict between the Schieringers and the Vetkopers party in 1494.

Daughter of van Lo(u)w Broers Bonninga and Hylck Feyckesd. van Harinxma and married to Jelmer Sytsma; her father was a member of the Schieringers. When her spouse was captured by the Vetkopers in 1494, she defended the fortress until she could have her spouse released and receive a promise of free evacuation.

Bonninga was the subject of many publications from 1522 and forward and played an important role in the national romanticism of Friesland in the 19th century.

References

 http://www.inghist.nl/Onderzoek/Projecten/DVN/lemmata/data/AtsBonninga

Year of birth unknown
Year of death unknown
Medieval Dutch nobility
Medieval Dutch women
People from Gaasterlân-Sleat
Women in medieval European warfare
Women in war in the Netherlands
Women in 15th-century warfare
15th-century women of the Holy Roman Empire
Medieval West Frisians
Frisian women